WMEV-FM is a Country-formatted broadcast radio station licensed to Marion, Virginia, serving Southwestern Virginia. WMEV-FM is owned and operated by Bristol Broadcasting Company.

Signal
WMEV-FM's signal, which broadcasts with an effective radiated power of 100,000 watts, covers parts of Virginia, Tennessee, West Virginia, North Carolina, and Kentucky.

History
WMEV-FM signed on June 21, 1961. Bob and Stella Wolfenden started WMEV and WMEV-FM, selling them in 1982 to Marion natives Hugh and Barbara Gwyn, who increased the FM's signal strength. In 1998, Holston Valley Broadcasting bought the stations.

Effective January 1, 2017, Glenwood Communications sold WMEV-FM, sister station WUKZ, and translator W266BM to Bristol Broadcasting Company for $1.75 million.

References

External links
93.9 WMEV Online

MEV-FM
Radio stations established in 1961